Richard Byrd Hart (October 20, 1935 – April 10, 2013) was an American professional golfer who played on the PGA Tour in the 1960s.

At the 1963 PGA Championship, Hart led after both 18 and 36 holes (66 & 72) but faded in the third and fourth rounds (76 & 74) to finish the tournament at T-17 — his best finish in a major championship.

Hart's one tour victory came at the 1965 Azalea Open Invitational. He defeated Phil Rodgers on the eighth hole of a sudden death playoff. The playoff remains one of the longest in PGA Tour history.

A 43-year club pro at Hinsdale Golf Club in Hinsdale, Illinois, Hart was inducted into the Illinois Golf Hall of Fame in 1990.

Hart died in Covington, Louisiana in 2013.

Professional wins (6)

PGA Tour wins (1)

PGA Tour playoff record (1–0)

Other wins (5)
1963 Illinois PGA Championship
1964 Illinois Open
1966 Illinois PGA Championship
1969 Illinois Open
1971 Illinois Open

References

External links

1965 Sports Illustrated article covering Hart

American male golfers
PGA Tour golfers
Golfers from Massachusetts
Golfers from Illinois
Sportspeople from Salem, Massachusetts
People from Abita Springs, Louisiana
1935 births
2013 deaths
20th-century American people
21st-century American people